Cypress Ridge Golf Course is located in Arroyo Grande, California—which is on the Central Coast of California. The golf course is a Peter Jacobsen Signature Golf Course, designed by Jacobsen Hardy Design.  In its design and conception, Jacobsen Hardy utilized the natural surroundings of the area to make this central coast golf course truly unique. The golf course opened in 1999.  It is rated 4½ stars by Golf Digest "Best Places to Play".

Situated in San Luis Obispo County, in the town of Arroyo Grande, puts Cypress Ridge on the Central Coast of California.  Nearby is Pismo Beach as well as extraordinary wine country in Paso Robles, San Luis Obispo, and the Santa Ynez Valley.

References

External links
 Cypress Ridge Website

Golf clubs and courses in California
Arroyo Grande, California